The Omni Commons is a group of nine collectives in San Francisco's Bay Area devoted to DIY and community education. It traces its inception to the Occupy movement, specifically Occupy Oakland, and was founded in 2014 on the principles of "community, positive creation and radical inclusion".

Building 
Constructed in 1933, the building at 4799 Shattuck Ave in Oakland was conceived as the meeting hall for The Ligure Club, the Italian garbagemen's social club. The 22,000 sq. ft. building hosts a 4,000 sq. ft. ballroom, a large foyer, a Disco room with formerly-illuminated floors, a children's play room, a large industrial kitchen under renovation, and many more spaces of varying sizes.

Collectives 
The Commons currently consist of 9 member collectives ranging from activist groups to hackerspaces, each of which have a representative in the Omni Commons' Delegates Council, the decision-making body of the group. Collectives include:

Counter Culture Labs 
A biohacker and citizen science lab in Oakland’s Temescal neighborhood, Counter Culture Labs serves as a community laboratory and hackerspace for people of any skill level.

Sudo Room 
An open-membership hackerspace in Oakland with an emphasis on community outreach and service. Active projects hosted by Sudo Room include a weekly hardware hack night, regular programming hangouts, and People's Open Network, a community wireless network being developed by Sudo Mesh, in the San Francisco Bay Area.

See also 
 Double Union
 Noisebridge

References

External links 
 https://omnicommons.org/ Omni Commons website

Occupy Oakland
Organizations based in Oakland, California
Hackerspaces in the San Francisco Bay Area
DIY culture
Public laboratories
Public commons